Mercedes Molto (born Mercedes Moltó Contreras on February 21, 1974, in Barcelona, Spain) is a Spanish-born Mexican actress.

Biography
Molto was born February 21, 1974, in Barcelona, Spain. She is the daughter of Panamanian otorhinolaryngology medical surgeon Dr. José Moltó Ordoñez and Mercedes Contreras. She completed her primary and secondary studies in Panama, former student of officially CIDMI since she graduated from the International College of Mary Immaculate, located in La Alameda, Panama, is one of the best schools in Panama and there are still teachers who remember her fondly. She studied at CEA Televisa and has participated in a number of telenovelas of that company. At the age of sixteen, she arrived in Mexico, where she began her acting career.

On September 15, 2007, she married surgeon Noel Salgado. In 2013 after 6 years of marriage, they announced they were getting divorced. She currently lives in Miami.

Filmography

Awards and nominations

Premios TVyNovelas

References

External links

1974 births
Living people
Mexican telenovela actresses
Mexican television actresses
20th-century Mexican actresses
21st-century Mexican actresses
Actresses from Barcelona
Spanish emigrants to Mexico
Mexican people of Panamanian descent
Naturalized citizens of Mexico
People from Barcelona
Spanish people of Panamanian descent